The year 1961 in film involved some significant events, with West Side Story winning 10 Academy Awards.

Top-grossing films (U.S.)

The top ten 1961 released films by box office gross in North America are as follows:

Top-grossing films by country
The highest-grossing 1961 films from countries outside of North America.

Events
 May 13 – Legendary actor Gary Cooper dies at the age of 60 in Los Angeles from colon and prostate cancer. Best known for his appearances in classic films such as Wings, Meet John Doe, Sergeant York, For Whom the Bell Tolls and High Noon, Cooper was one of the biggest stars of Hollywood's Golden Age and won two Academy Awards for Best Actor.
 June 28 – Cubby Broccoli and Harry Saltzman sign a multi-picture deal with United Artists to produce a series of films based on the novels of Ian Fleming starting with either Dr. No or Diamonds Are Forever. The series goes on to become the highest-grossing film series of all-time.
 July 17 – Trans World Airlines screens Come September to the press aboard one of its jets to introduce in-flight movies.
 October 18 – The film version of the musical West Side Story is released. Directed by Robert Wise and Jerome Robbins and starring Natalie Wood, Richard Beymer, Russ Tamblyn, Rita Moreno and George Chakiris, it becomes the year's highest-grossing film and goes on to win ten Academy Awards, including Best Picture, Best Director (for Wise and Robbins), Best Supporting Actor (for Chakiris) and Best Supporting Actress (for Moreno).

Awards

1961 film releases
United States unless stated

January–March
January 1961
6 January
The Marriage-Go-Round
16 January
The Girl on the Boat
21 January
Pigs and Battleships (Japan)
24 January
His and Hers
La Notte (Italy/France)
25 January
One Hundred and One Dalmatians
26 January
The Mark
27 January
Jhumroo (India)
28 January
A Fever in the Blood
A Soldier's Prayer (Japan)
February 1961
1 February
The Misfits
2 February
Garibaldi (Italy)
9 February
Girl with a Suitcase (Italy)
Mother Joan of the Angels (Poland)
No Love for Johnnie
10 February
Cry for Happy
15 February
The Coachman (South Korea)
16 February
The Long and the Short and the Tall
20 February
Nude on the Moon
Reptilicus
22 February
The Great Impostor
March 1961
1 March
Posse from Hell
2 March
The Rebel
3 March
Lola (France)
10 March
Five Golden Hours (Italy)
Go Naked in the World (Italy)
15 March
The Terror of the Tongs
16 March
The Absent-Minded Professor
20 March
Blast of Silence
22 March
All in a Night's Work
23 March
Carry On Regardless
24 March
Town Without Pity (U.S./West Germany/Switzerland)
Underworld U.S.A.
26 March
The Hoodlum Priest
Konga
27 March
The Assassin (Italy)
29 March
Gorgo
Violent Life (Italy)
30 March
One-Eyed Jacks

April–June
April 1961
2 April
The Sins of Rachel Cade
4 April
The Greengage Summer
Mr. Topaze
Two Living, One Dead (U.K./Sweden)
13 April
Madison Avenue
Nazrana (India)
17 April
Master of the World
18 April
Sanctuary
19 April
Hercules and the Conquest of Atlantis (Italy)
Please, Not Now! (France)
24 April
The Secret Ways
25 April
Yojimbo (Japan)
27 April
The Guns of Navarone
May 1961
2 May
The Beast of Yucca Flats
3 May
Atlantis, the Lost Continent
4 May
Parrish
5 May
Return to Peyton Place
Teen Kanya (India)
12 May
Mad Dog Coll
14 May
Angel Baby
Goliath Against the Giants (Italy)
Viridiana (Mexico/Spain)
17 May
The Long Absence (France)
Professor Mamlock (East Germany)
The Right Approach
21 May
A Bomb Was Stolen (Romania)
24 May
The Young Savages
26 May
Snow White and the Three Stooges
27 May
The Last Time I Saw Archie
29 May
A Raisin in the Sun
June 1961
1 June
The Pleasure of His Company
2 June
Gidget Goes Hawaiian
5 June
Taste of Fear
6 June
The Deadly Companions
7 June
The Curse of the Werewolf
Scarlet Sails
8 June
The Last Sunset
Romanoff and Juliet
Wild in the Country
11 June
The Big Bankroll
13 June
The Lovemakers (France)
16 June
The Colossus of Rhodes (Italy)
21 June
The Parent Trap
Two Loves
22 June
Antigone (Greece)
Black Silk (Thailand)
Flame in the Streets
25 June
Last Year at Marienbad (France)
28 June
Fanny
Homicidal
The Ladies Man
The Naked Edge
Question 7 (West Germany/U.S.)
29 June
Goodbye Again (France/U.S.)

July–September
July 1961
3 July
The Miracle of Father Malachia (West Germany)
9 July
Armored Command
12 July
Francis of Assisi
Voyage to the Bottom of the Sea
13 July
The Exiles
16 July
The Big Gamble
19 July
By Love Possessed
Invasion of the Neptune Men (Japan)
20 July
Whistle Down the Wind
26 July
Tammy Tell Me True
Two Rode Together
30 July
Mothra (Japan)
31 July
And Love Has Vanished (Yugoslavia)
August 1961
9 August
Come September
The Frightened City
12 August
The Pit and the Pendulum
15 August
Marines, Let's Go
23 August
The Fascist (Italy)
The Honeymoon Machine
The Young Doctors
25 August
Ada
Gunga Jumna (India)
26 August
The Houseguest and My Mother (South Korea)
29 August
The Black Monocle (France)
30 August
Victim
31 August
Accattone (Italy)
September 1961
4 September
Peace to Him Who Enters (USSR)
6 September
A Woman Is a Woman (France)
8 September
Harry and the Butler (Denmark)
Striped Trip (USSR)
15 September
A Taste of Honey
16 September
Immortal Love (Japan)
20 September
Claudelle Inglish
Man-Trap
Nefertiti, Queen of the Nile (Italy)
21 September
The Fabulous Baron Munchausen (Czechoslovakia)
22 September
Léon Morin, Priest (France)
25 September
The Hustler
26 September
Murder, She Said
A Thunder of Drums
27 September
Paris Blues
30 September
Then Nilavu (India)

October–December
October 1961
5 October
Breakfast at Tiffany's
8 October
The Last War (Japan)
10 October
Splendor in the Grass
11 October
Back Street
The Explosive Generation
King of Kings
16 October
Through a Glass Darkly (Sweden)
17 October
Bridge to the Sun
What a Whopper
18 October
The Devil at 4 O'Clock
Mr. Sardonicus
West Side Story
21 October
Dersu Uzala (USSR)
Il Posto (Italy)
23 October
Johnny Nobody
26 October
The Last Judgment (Italy)
28 October
The Mask
29 October
The End of Summer (Japan)
November 1961
1 November
The Comancheros
2 November
Bachelor in Paradise
8 November
Susan Slade
Too Late Blues
9 November
Flower Drum Song
16 November 
Hercules in the Haunted World (Italy)
Summer and Smoke
22 November
Blue Hawaii
The George Raft Story
Valley of the Dragons
23 November
The Day the Earth Caught Fire
24 November
The Innocents
28 November
The Errand Boy
December 1961
6 December
El Cid (U.S./Italy)
Tintin and the Golden Fleece (France)
7 December
Five Minutes to Live
13 December
Paris Belongs to Us
The Young Ones
14 December
Babes in Toyland
Judgment at Nuremberg
The Outsider
15 December
One, Two, Three
19 December
The Children's Hour
A Difficult Life (Italy)
Pocketful of Miracles
When the Trees Were Tall (USSR)
20 December
Cash on Demand
Divorce Italian Style (Italy)
Everything's Ducky
Lover Come Back
Mysterious Island
Sail a Crooked Ship
Something Wild
22 December
The Second Time Around
Two Women(Italy/West Germany)
23 December
Barabbas (Italy)
27 December
A Majority of One
28 December
Flight of the Lost Balloon
30 December
The Steamroller and the Violin (USSR)

Notable films released in 1961
US unless stated

A
 The Absent-Minded Professor, starring Fred MacMurray
 Accattone, directed by Pier Paolo Pasolini – (Italy)
 Ada, starring Dean Martin and Susan Hayward
 All in a Night's Work, starring Dean Martin and Shirley MacLaine
 Ana Wa Banati, starring Salah Zulfikar, Zaki Rostom and Fayza Ahmed – (Egypt)
 And Love Has Vanished (Dvoje) – (Yugoslavia)
 Angel Baby, starring Salome Jens and Mercedes McCambridge
 Antigone, starring Irene Papas – (Greece)
 Armored Command, starring Howard Keel and Tina Louise
 The Artillery Sergeant Kalen (Ogniomistrz Kaleń) – (Poland)
 The Assassin (L'Assassino), starring Marcello Mastroianni – (Italy)
 Atlantis, the Lost Continent, starring John Dall

B
 Babes in Toyland, starring Ray Bolger, Tommy Sands, Annette Funicello
 Bachelor in Paradise, starring Bob Hope, Lana Turner, Janis Paige, Jim Hutton, Paula Prentiss
 Back Street, starring Susan Hayward, John Gavin, Vera Miles
 Bandits of Orgosolo – (Italy)
 Barabbas, starring Anthony Quinn, Silvana Mangano and Jack Palance – (Italy)
 The Big Bankroll, aka King of the Roaring 20s, starring David Janssen, Mickey Rooney, Diana Dors
 The Big Gamble, starring Stephen Boyd
 The Black Monocle (Le monocle noir), directed by Georges Lautner
 Black Silk (Prae Dum) – (Thailand)
 Blast of Silence, directed by and starring Allen Baron
 The Blonde from Buenos Aires (Una Americana en Buenos Aires), starring Mamie Van Doren and Jean-Pierre Aumont – (Argentina/France)
 Blue Hawaii, starring Elvis Presley (his biggest box-office success), with Joan Blackman and Angela Lansbury
 Boatmen of Thessaloniki (Солунските Атентатори) – (Yugoslavia)
 A Bomb Was Stolen (S-a furat o bombă) – (Romania)
 Bootleggers (Samogonshchiki) – (USSR)
 Breakfast at Tiffany's, directed by Blake Edwards, starring Audrey Hepburn, George Peppard, Patricia Neal, Buddy Ebsen
 Bridge to the Sun, starring Carroll Baker and James Shigeta – (France/U.S.)
 By Love Possessed, starring Lana Turner, Efrem Zimbalist, Jr., George Hamilton

C
 Carry On Regardless, starring Sid James, Kenneth Connor and Charles Hawtrey – (U.K.)
 Cash on Demand, starring Peter Cushing and André Morell – (U.K.)
 On The Tiger's Back (A cavallod della tigre ), starring Nino Manfredi – (Italy)
 The Children's Hour, starring Audrey Hepburn, Shirley MacLaine, James Garner and Miriam Hopkins
 Chronicle of Flaming Years (Povest plamennykh let) – (USSR)
 Claudelle Inglish, starring Diane McBain and Arthur Kennedy
 The Coachman (Mabu) – (South Korea)
 The Colossus of Rhodes, directed by Sergio Leone, starring Rory Calhoun – (Italy)
 The Comancheros, starring John Wayne, Stuart Whitman, Lee Marvin and Ina Balin
Come September, starring Rock Hudson, Gina Lollobrigida, Sandra Dee and Bobby Darin
 Cry for Happy, starring Glenn Ford, Miyoshi Umeki and Donald O'Connor
 The Curse of the Werewolf, starring Clifford Evans and Oliver Reed – (U.K.)

D
 The Day the Earth Caught Fire, starring Edward Judd – (U.K.)
 The Deadly Companions, directed by Sam Peckinpah, starring Maureen O'Hara and Brian Keith
 Dersu Uzala – (USSR)
 The Devil at 4 O'Clock, directed by Mervyn LeRoy, starring Frank Sinatra, Spencer Tracy, Grégoire Aslan
 A Difficult Life (Una vita difficile), directed by Dino Risi, starring Alberto Sordi – (Italy)
 Divorce Italian Style (Divorzio all'italiana), directed by Pietro Germi, starring Marcello Mastroianni – (Italy)
 Dondi, starring David Janssen

E
 El Cid, directed by Anthony Mann, starring Charlton Heston and Sophia Loren – (U.S./Italy)
 The End of Summer (Kohayagawa-ke no aki), directed by Yasujirō Ozu – (Japan)
 The End of the Cancageiros (A Morte Comanda o Cangaço) – (Brazil)
 The Errand Boy, directed by and starring Jerry Lewis
 Everything's Ducky, starring Buddy Hackett
 The Exiles – documentary
 The Explosive Generation, starring William Shatner and Patty McCormack

F
 The Fabulous Baron Munchausen (Baron Prášil), directed by Karel Zeman – (Czechoslovakia)
 Fanny, starring Charles Boyer and Leslie Caron
 The Fascist (Il federale), starring Ugo Tognazzi – (Italy)
 A Fever in the Blood, starring Efrem Zimbalist, Jr., Angie Dickinson, Don Ameche and Jack Kelly
 Five Golden Hours, starring Robert Wagner, Cyd Charisse, Ernie Kovacs
 Five Minutes to Live, starring Johnny Cash
 Flight of the Lost Balloon, directed by Nathan Juran and starring Mala Powers and Marshall Thompson
 Flooded Out (Los inundados), directed by Fernando Birri – (Argentina)
 Flower Drum Song, starring Nancy Kwan
 Francis of Assisi, directed by Michael Curtiz, starring Bradford Dillman and Dolores Hart
 The Frightened City, starring Sean Connery, John Gregson, Yvonne Romain

G
 Garibaldi (Viva l'Italia!), directed by Roberto Rossellini – (Italy)
 The George Raft Story, starring Jayne Mansfield and Ray Danton
 Gidget Goes Hawaiian, starring Deborah Walley
 The Girl on the Boat, starring Norman Wisdom – (U.K.)
 Girl with a Suitcase (La Ragazza con la valigia), starring Claudia Cardinale – (Italy)
 Go Naked in the World, starring Gina Lollobrigida and Anthony Franciosa – (Italy)
 Goliath Against the Giants (Goliath contro i giganti), directed by Guido Malatesta – (Italy)
 Goodbye Again, starring Ingrid Bergman and Yves Montand – (France/U.S.)
 Gorgo, starring Bill Travers – (U.K.)
 The Great Impostor, starring Tony Curtis
 The Greengage Summer, starring Kenneth More and Susannah York – (U.K.)
 Gunga Jumna, starring Dilip Kumar and Vyjayanthimala – (India)
 The Guns of Navarone, directed by J. Lee Thompson, starring Gregory Peck, David Niven and Anthony Quinn – (U.K.)

H
 Harry and the Butler (Harry og kammertjeneren) – (Denmark)
 Havoc in Heaven (aka The Monkey King), an animated films – (China)
 Hercules and the Conquest of Atlantis, (Ercole alla conquista di Atlantide), directed by Vittorio Cottafavi – (Italy)
 Hercules in the Haunted World (Ercole al centro della terra), directed by Mario Bava – (Italy)
 His and Hers, directed by Brian Desmond Hurst, starring Terry-Thomas and Janette Scott – (U.K.)
 Hogs and Warships (Buta to gunkan), directed by Shohei Imamura – (Japan)
 Homicidal, directed by William Castle
 The Honeymoon Machine, starring Steve McQueen, Brigid Bazlen, Jim Hutton, Paula Prentiss
 The Hoodlum Priest, starring Don Murray
 The Human Condition, directed by Masaki Kobayashi – (Japan)
 The Houseguest and My Mother – (South Korea)
 The Hustler, directed by Robert Rossen, starring Paul Newman, Piper Laurie, George C. Scott, Jackie Gleason

I
 Immortal Love (Eien no hito) – (Japan)
 The Innocents, starring Deborah Kerr – (U.K.)

J

 Jhumroo, starring Madhubala and Kishore Kumar – (India)
 Johnny Nobody, directed by and starring Nigel Patrick – (U.K.)
 Judgment at Nuremberg, directed by Stanley Kramer, starring Spencer Tracy, Burt Lancaster, Marlene Dietrich, Maximilian Schell, Judy Garland, Montgomery Clift, Richard Widmark, William Shatner

K
 King of Kings, directed by Nicholas Ray, starring Jeffrey Hunter, Robert Ryan, Siobhán McKenna, Hurd Hatfield, Rita Gam, Rip Torn
 The Knife (Het Mes), directed by Fons Rademakers – (Netherlands)

L
 The Ladies Man, directed by and starring Jerry Lewis
 The Last Judgment (Il Giudizio universale), directed by Vittorio De Sica – (Italy)
 The Last Sunset, starring Rock Hudson, Kirk Douglas, Dorothy Malone, Joseph Cotten, Carol Lynley
 The Last Time I Saw Archie, starring Robert Mitchum and Jack Webb
 The Last War (Sekai Daisensō) – (Japan)
 Last Year at Marienbad (L'Année dernière à Marienbad), directed by Alain Resnais, starring Delphine Seyrig – Golden Lion winner – (France)
 Léon Morin, Priest (Léon Morin, prêtre), starring Jean-Paul Belmondo – (France)
 Lola, directed by Jacques Demy, starring Anouk Aimée – (France)
 The Long Absence (Une aussi longue absence), directed by Henri Colpi – (France)
 The Long and the Short and the Tall, starring Laurence Harvey and Richard Harris – (U.K.)
 Look in Any Window, starring Paul Anka and Ruth Roman
 The Lovemakers (La Viaccia), starring Claudia Cardinale and Jean-Paul Belmondo – (Italy)
 Lover Come Back, starring Doris Day and Rock Hudson

M
 Mad Dog Coll, directed by Burt Balaban and starring John Davis Chandler
 A Majority of One, starring Rosalind Russell and Alec Guinness
 Man-Trap, starring Jeffrey Hunter, David Janssen and Stella Stevens
 Marines, Let's Go, starring Tom Tryon and David Hedison
 The Mark, starring Stuart Whitman and Maria Schell – (U.K.)
 The Marriage-Go-Round, starring James Mason and Julie Newmar
 The Mask, starring Paul Stevens – (Canada)
 Master of the World, directed by William Witney, starring Vincent Price and Charles Bronson
 The Miracle of Father Malachia (Das Wunder des Malachias), directed by Bernhard Wicki – (West Germany)
 The Misfits, directed by John Huston, starring Marilyn Monroe, Clark Gable and Montgomery Clift
 Mother Joan of the Angels (Matka Joanna od Aniołów), directed by Jerzy Kawalerowicz – (Poland)
 Mothra, directed by Ishirō Honda – (Japan)
 Mr. Sardonicus, directed by William Castle
 Mr. Topaze (a.k.a. I Like Money), directed by and starring Peter Sellers – (U.K.)
 Murder, She Said, directed by George Pollock and starring Margaret Rutherford – (U.K.)
Mysterious Island, starring Michael Craig, Michael Callan and Joan Greenwood

N
 The Naked Edge, starring Gary Cooper (in his final film) and Deborah Kerr
 Nazrana (Gift), starring Raj Kapoor and Vyjayanthimala – (India)
 Nefertiti, Queen of the Nile (Nefertiti, regina del Nilo), starring Jeanne Crain and Vincent Price – (Italy)
 No Love for Johnnie, starring Peter Finch – (U.K.)
 La Notte (The Night), directed by Michelangelo Antonioni, starring Marcello Mastroianni and Jeanne Moreau – Golden Bear winner – (Italy/France)
 Nude on the Moon, directed by Doris Wishman

O
 One-Eyed Jacks, directed by and starring Marlon Brando, with Karl Malden, Katy Jurado, Ben Johnson
 One Hundred and One Dalmatians, featuring the voices of Rod Taylor and Betty Lou Gerson
 One, Two, Three, directed by Billy Wilder, starring James Cagney, Horst Buchholz, Pamela Tiffin, Arlene Francis
 The Outsider, a biography starring Tony Curtis as World War II Marine Ira Hayes

P
 The Parent Trap, starring Hayley Mills, Maureen O'Hara and Brian Keith
 Paris Belongs to Us (Paris nous appartient), directed by Jacques Rivette – (France)
 Paris Blues, starring Sidney Poitier, Paul Newman, Joanne Woodward and Diahann Carroll
 Parrish, starring Troy Donahue, Connie Stevens, Claudette Colbert
 Peace to Him Who Enters (Mir vkhodyashchemu) – (USSR)
 Pigs and Battleships (Buta to gunkan), directed by Shohei Imamura – (Japan)
 The Pit and the Pendulum, starring Vincent Price
 Plácido, directed by Luis García Berlanga – (Spain)
 Please, Not Now! (La bride sur le cou), starring Brigitte Bardot – (France)
 The Pleasure of His Company, starring Fred Astaire and Debbie Reynolds
 Pocketful of Miracles, final film of director Frank Capra, starring Bette Davis, Glenn Ford, Hope Lange and Arthur O'Connell
 Portrait of a Mobster, starring Vic Morrow
 Posse from Hell, directed by Herbert Coleman, starring Audie Murphy and John Saxon
 Il posto, directed by Ermanno Olmi – (Italy)
Professor Mamlock, directed by Konrad Wolf – (East Germany)

Q
 Question 7, directed by Stuart Rosenberg – (U.S./West Germany)

R
 A Raisin in the Sun, starring Sidney Poitier and Ruby Dee
 The Rebel, starring Tony Hancock – (U.K.)
 Return to Peyton Place, directed by José Ferrer, starring Carol Lynley, Tuesday Weld and Eleanor Parker
 The Right Approach, starring Martha Hyer, Frankie Vaughan and Juliet Prowse
 Romanoff and Juliet, starring Peter Ustinov and Sandra Dee
 The Roman Spring of Mrs. Stone, starring Vivien Leigh and Warren Beatty – (U.K.)

S
 Sail a Crooked Ship, starring Ernie Kovacs, Robert Wagner, Dolores Hart and Frank Gorshin
 Sanctuary, starring Lee Remick and Yves Montand
 Scarlet Sails (Алые Паруса), directed by Alexandr Ptushko – (USSR)
 The Second Time Around, starring Debbie Reynolds, Andy Griffith and Juliet Prowse
 The Secret Ways, starring Richard Widmark
 Seetarama Kalyanam, directed by and starring N. T. Rama Rao – (India)
 Sennin Buraku (Hermit Village) – (Japan)
 The Sins of Rachel Cade, starring Angie Dickinson
 A Soldier's Prayer (Ningen no jôken), directed by Masaki Kobayashi – (Japan)
 Something Wild, starring Carroll Baker and Ralph Meeker
 A Song About the Gray Pigeon (Piesen o sivém holubovi), directed by Stanislav Barabáš – (Czechoslovakia)
 Splendor in the Grass, starring Natalie Wood and Warren Beatty
 Spotlight on a Murderer (Pleins feux sur l'assassin), directed by Georges Franju – (France)
 The Steamroller and the Violin (Katok i skripka), directed by Andrei Tarkovsky – (USSR)
 A Storm of Love, starring Salah Zulfikar and Nahed Sherif – (Egypt)
 Summer and Smoke, starring Geraldine Page and Laurence Harvey
 Susan Slade, starring Troy Donahue and Connie Stevens

T
 Tammy Tell Me True, starring Sandra Dee
 Taste of Fear, starring Susan Strasberg – (U.K.)
 Taxi for Tobruk (Un taxi pour Tobrouk), directed by Denys de La Patellière – (France)
 Then Nilavu (Honeymoon), starring Gemini Ganesan and Vyjayanthimala – (India)
 A Taste of Honey, directed by Tony Richardson, starring Rita Tushingham – (U.K.)
 That’s What Love Is, directed by Mahmoud Zulfikar, starring Salah Zulfikar, Sabah – (Egypt)
 The Terror of the Tongs, starring Geoffrey Toone, Christopher Lee and Yvonne Monlaur – (U.K.)
 Three Daughters (Teen Kanya), directed by Satyajit Ray – (India)
 Through a Glass Darkly (Såsom i en spegel), directed by Ingmar Bergman – (Sweden)
 A Thunder of Drums, starring Richard Boone, George Hamilton and Luana Patten
 Tintin and the Golden Fleece (Tintin et le mystère de la toison d'or), directed by Jean-Jacques Vierne – (France)
 Too Late Blues, starring Bobby Darin
 Town Without Pity (Stadt ohne Mitleid), directed by Gottfried Reinhardt and starring Kirk Douglas – (U.S./West Germany/Switzerland)
 Two Living, One Dead, directed by Anthony Asquith, starring Patrick McGoohan – (U.K./Sweden)
 Two Loves, starring Shirley MacLaine
 Two Rode Together, starring James Stewart and Richard Widmark

U
 Underworld U.S.A., directed by Samuel Fuller, starring Cliff Robertson

V
Valley of the Dragons
 Victim, directed by Basil Dearden, starring Dirk Bogarde and Sylvia Syms – (U.K.)
 Violent Life (Una vita violenta) – (Italy)
 Viridiana, directed by Luis Buñuel – Palme d'Or winner – (Mexico/Spain)
 Voyage to the Bottom of the Sea, starring Walter Pidgeon, Joan Fontaine, Robert Sterling, Peter Lorre, Barbara Eden

W
 We Were Young (A byahme mladi) – (Bulgaria)
 West Side Story, starring Natalie Wood, Richard Beymer, Russ Tamblyn, Rita Moreno, George Chakiris
What A Whopper, directed by Gilbert Gunn, starring Adam Faith, Sidney James, Carole Lesley and Terence Longdon – (U.K.)
 When the Trees Were Tall (Kogda derevya byli bolshimi) – (USSR)
 Whistle Down the Wind, directed by Bryan Forbes, starring Hayley Mills and Alan Bates – (U.K.)
 Wife Number 13 (Al zouga talattashar) – (Egypt)
 Wild in the Country, starring Elvis Presley with Hope Lange, Tuesday Weld, Millie Perkins
 A Woman Is a Woman (Une Femme est une femme), directed by Jean-Luc Godard, starring Jean-Paul Belmondo and Anna Karina – (France)

Y
 Yojimbo, directed by Akira Kurosawa, starring Toshiro Mifune – (Japan)
 The Young Doctors, starring Ben Gazzara and Dick Clark
 The Young Ones, starring Cliff Richard and The Shadows – (U.K.)
 The Young Savages, starring Burt Lancaster and Dina Merrill

Short film series
 Looney Tunes (1930–1969)
 Terrytoons (1930–1964)
 Merrie Melodies (1931–1969)
 Goofy (1961)
 Tom and Jerry (1940–1967)
 Noveltoons (1943–1967)
 Loopy De Loop (1959–1965)
 The Alvin Show (1961–1962)

Births
 January 2
Neil Dudgeon, English actor
Todd Haynes, American director
 January 4 - Graham McTavish, Scottish actor
 January 9 - Candi Milo, American actress, voice actress and singer
 January 10 - Mark Venturini, American actor (died 1996)
 January 12 - Simon Russell Beale, English actor
 January 13
Julia Louis-Dreyfus, American actress
 January 18 - Bob Peterson (filmmaker), American animator, director, screenwriter and voice actor
 January 24 – Nastassja Kinski, German actress
 January 25 - Roger Yuan, American martial artist, stunt coordinator/performer and actor
 February 5 - Tim Meadows, American actor and comedian
 February 11 – Carey Lowell, American actress
 February 20 - Imogen Stubbs, English actress and writer
 February 21
Christopher Atkins, American actor
Martha Hackett, American actress
 February 23 - David Warshofsky, American actor
 February 24
Kasi Lemmons, American director, screenwriter and actress
Emilio Rivera, American actor and stand-up comedian
 February 28
Rae Dawn Chong, Canadian-American actress
Mark Ferguson, Australian actor
 March 8 – Camryn Manheim, American actress
 March 11
Elias Koteas, Canadian actor
Greg Kramer, British-Canadian actor and director (died 2013)
 March 17
Dana Reeve, American actress and singer (died 2006)
Casey Siemaszko, American actor
 March 21 – Kassie DePaiva, American actress and singer
 March 25
John Stockwell (actor), American actor, director, producer and writer
Aron Warner, American producer and voice actor
 March 29 - Amy Sedaris, American actress, comedian and writer
 March 31 - Gary Winick, American filmmaker (died 2011)
 April 2 - Christopher Meloni, American actor
 April 3 – Eddie Murphy, American actor and comedian
 April 5 - Lisa Zane, American actress and singer
 April 6 – Gene Eugene, Canadian actor, lead singer of Adam Again (died 2000)
 April 10 - Lorraine Ashbourne, English actress
 April 12 - Magda Szubanski, Australian comedy actress
 April 14 – Robert Carlyle, Scottish actor
 April 18
Jane Leeves, English actress
Joe Whyte, American actor
 April 21 - Kate Vernon, Canadian-born American actress
 April 23 
Þröstur Leó Gunnarsson, Icelandic actor
George Lopez, American comedian and actor
 May 2 - Beeban Kidron, British filmmaker
 May 6
George Clooney American actor, writer, director and producer
Wally Wingert, American actor, voice actor, singer and former radio personality
 May 8 – David Winning, Canadian-American director, producer and screenwriter
 May 9 - John Corbett, American actor and singer
 May 12 - Lar Park Lincoln, American actress
 May 13 - Siobhan Fallon Hogan, American actress and comedian
 May 14 – Tim Roth, English actor
 May 16 - Kevin McDonald, Canadian actor, voice actor and comedian
 May 17 - Corey Johnson (actor), American character actor
 May 20 - Owen Teale, Welsh character actor
 May 21 - Brent Briscoe, American character actor and screenwriter (died 2017)
 May 30 – Harry Enfield, English actor, comedian, writer and director.
 May 31 – Lea Thompson, American actress
 June 2: Liam Cunningham, Irish actor
 June 4: Julie White, American actress
 June 5:
 Mary Kay Bergman, American voice actress and voice-over teacher (died 1999)
 Catherine McGille, American actress
 June 9
Michael J. Fox, Canadian actor
Aaron Sorkin, American screenwriter, actor, writer, producer and director
 June 15 - Jim Hanks, American actor and filmmaker
 June 25
Timur Bekmambetov, Russian-Kazakh director, producer and screenwriter
Ricky Gervais, English comedian, actor, writer, producer and director
 June 27 - Tim Whitnall, English playwright, screenwriter and actor
 July 12 - Caroline Bliss, English actress
 July 14 – Jackie Earle Haley, American actor
 July 15 – Forest Whitaker, American actor
 July 17 - Anthony Lee (actor), American actor (died 2000)
 July 18 – Elizabeth McGovern, American actress
 July 19 - Campbell Scott, American actor, producer and director
 July 23 – Woody Harrelson, American actor
 July 28 - Debi Sue Voorhees, American actress
 July 30 – Laurence Fishburne, American actor
 August 3 - Molly Hagan, American actress
 August 5
Tawny Kitaen, American actress and model (died 2021)
Janet McTeer, English actress
 August 7 - Maggie Wheeler, American actress
 August 16 - Noam Murro, Israeli director and producer
 August 18 - Glenn Plummer, American actor
 August 19 - Tony Longo, American actor (died 2015)
 August 20 - Joe Pasquale, English comedian, actor and television personality
 August 21 - Eric Darnell, American animator, storyboard artist, director, writer and voice actor
 August 22 - Stephen Stanton, American actor, voice actor, comedian and visual effects artist
 August 23 - Michael "Bear" Taliferro, American actor, sportsman and singer (died 2006)
 August 25 - Joanne Whalley, English actress
 August 27 - Tim Johnson (film director), American director and producer
 August 28 – Jennifer Coolidge, American actress
 September 2 - Eugenio Derbez, Mexican actor, comedian and filmmaker
 September 9 - Steven Eckholdt, American actor
 September 11 – E. G. Daily, American actress
 September 15
Noel MacNeal, American actor, director, puppeteer and writer
Colin McFarlane, English actor
 September 16 - Jen Tolley, American-Canadian actress, voice actress and singer
 September 18 – James Gandolfini, American actor (died 2013)
 September 20
Morwenna Banks, British comedy actress, writer and producer
James Colby, American actor (died 2018)
 September 22 – Bonnie Hunt, American actress and comedian
 September 23 - Chi McBride, American actor
 September 25 - Heather Locklear, American actress
 September 30 - Eric Stoltz, American actor, director and producer
 October 1 - Steve Purcell, American cartoonist, animator, game designer, and voice actor
 October 10 - Jodi Benson, American actress, voice actress and singer
 October 16 - Kim Wayans, American actress and comedian
 October 26 – Dylan McDermott, American actor
 October 27 - Joanna Scanlan, British actress and screenwriter
 October 31 – Peter Jackson, New Zealand director
 November 1 - Lauren-Marie Taylor, American actress
 November 4 – Ralph Macchio, American actor
 November 5
Gina Mastrogiacomo, American actress (died 2001)
Philip Moon (actor), American actor of Asian descent
 November 8 - John Costelloe (actor), American actor (died 2008)
 November 14 – D. B. Sweeney, American actor
 November 18 - Nick Chinlund, American actor
 November 19 – Meg Ryan, American actress
 November 22 – Mariel Hemingway, American actress
 November 27
Samantha Bond, English actress
Steve Oedekerk, American actor, stand-up comedian, director, editor, producer and screenwriter
 November 28
Alfonso Cuarón, Mexican director
Martin Clunes, English actor, comedian, director and television presenter
 November 29 – Tom Sizemore, American actor (died 2023)
 December 1 - Jeremy Northam, English actor and singer
 December 6 - Colin Salmon, British actor
 December 16
Shane Black, American filmmaker and actor
Gretchen Palmer, American actress
Jon Tenney, American actor
 December 26 - John Lynch (actor), Irish actor

Deaths
 January 13 – Blanche Ring, 89, American singer and actress, The Yankee Girl, It's the Old Army Game
 January 14 – Barry Fitzgerald, 72, Irish actor, Going My Way, The Quiet Man
 February 2 – Anna May Wong, 56, American actress, Shanghai Express, The Thief of Bagdad
 February 15 – Jack Whiting, 59, American actor, singer and dancer, Sailing Along, Give Me a Sailor
 February 17 – Nita Naldi, 66, American actress, Blood and Sand, Dr. Jekyll and Mr. Hyde
 February 26 – Harry Bannister, 71, American actor, The Girl of the Golden West
 March 6 – George Formby, 56, British actor, entertainer, It's in the Air, Off the Dole
 March 12 – Belinda Lee, 25, British actress, Long Night in 1943, The Goddess of Love (automobile accident)
 March 14 – Lies Noor, 23, Indonesian actress, Pulang (encephalitis)
 March 29 – Fritzi Ridgeway, 62, American actress, Ruggles of Red Gap, This Is Heaven
 April 27 – Roy Del Ruth, 67, American director, The Maltese Falcon, Broadway Melody of 1938
 May 4 – Anita Stewart, 66, American silent-film actress, The Combat, The Suspect
 May 13 – Gary Cooper, 60, American actor, High Noon, Meet John Doe, The Pride of the Yankees, Sergeant York
 May 18 – Henry O'Neill, 69, American actor, Shadow of the Thin Man, Anchors Aweigh
 May 19 – Ben Corbett, 69, American actor, The Fighting Renegade, Six-Gun Trail
 May 22 
Edward F. Cline, 69, American director, You Can't Cheat an Honest Man, Never Give a Sucker an Even Break
Joan Davis, 53, American actress, Hold That Ghost, If You Knew Susie
 June 2 – George S. Kaufman, 71, American playwright, A Night at the Opera
 June 10 – Vivienne Osborne, 64, American actress, Supernatural, Luxury Liner
 June 14 – Eddie Polo, 86, Austrian-American actor, The Vanishing Dagger
 June 15 – Luther Reed, 72, American director, Rio Rita, Hit the Deck
 June 17 – Jeff Chandler, 42, American actor, Broken Arrow, Merrill's Marauders
 June 27 – Paul Guilfoyle, 58, American actor, Winterset, The Grapes of Wrath
 June 30 – Lee de Forest, 87, American inventor of Phonofilm
 July 4 – Franklyn Farnum, 83, American actor, The Life of Emile Zola, The Lost Weekend, The Greatest Show on Earth
 July 9 – Alan Marshal, 52, Australian actor, The Adventures of Sherlock Holmes, House on Haunted Hill
 July 23 – Valentine Davies, 55, American screenwriter and director, The Glenn Miller Story, The Benny Goodman Story
 July 28 – Harry Gribbon, 76, American silent comedy actor, Fatty and Mabel at the San Diego Exposition, Down on the Farm, A Small Town Idol, The Cameraman
 August 4 – Maurice Tourneur, 85, French director, The Last of the Mohicans, The Poor Little Rich Girl
 August 17 – Violet Kemble-Cooper, 74, British actress, The Invisible Ray, David Copperfield
 August 20 – Dorothy Burgess, 54, American actress, In Old Arizona, Black Moon
 August 27 – Gail Russell, 36, American actress, Angel and the Badman, Seven Men from Now
 August 30 – Charles Coburn, 84, American actor, Gentlemen Prefer Blondes, The Lady Eve
 September 10 – Leo Carrillo, 81, American actor, Viva Villa!, Phantom of the Opera
 September 20 – Andrzej Munk, 39, Polish director and screenwriter, Man on the Tracks, Passenger
 September 22 – Marion Davies, 64, American actress, Show People, Cain and Mabel
 September 23 
John Eldredge, 57, American actor, The Woman in Red, His Brother's Wife 
Billy House, 72, American actor, Rogues of Sherwood Forest, Bedlam
 September 25 – Frank Fay, 69, American actor, Under a Texas Moon, The Matrimonial Bed
 September 26 – Juanita Hansen, 66, American actress, The Magic Cloak of Oz, The Phantom Foe
 October 1 – Donald Cook, 60, American actor, The Public Enemy, Baby Face
 October 11 – Chico Marx, 74, American actor, member of the Marx Brothers, A Night at the Opera, Duck Soup
 October 13
Maya Deren, 44, American experimental filmmaker, Meshes of the Afternoon, At Land
Zoltan Korda, 66, Hungarian director, The Four Feathers, Cry, the Beloved Country
 October 18 – Tsuru Aoki, 69, Japanese-born American actress, The Dragon Painter
 October 22 – Joseph Schenck, 82, Russian-born American pioneer motion picture executive, The General, Sherlock Jr.
 October 29 – Astrid Holm, 68, Danish actress, The Phantom Carriage, Häxan
 November 15 
Elsie Ferguson, 78, American actress, The Witness for the Defense, Scarlet Pages
Douglas Walton, 51, Canadian actor, Bride of Frankenstein, Murder, My Sweet
 November 18 – Eduard Tisse, 64, Soviet cinematographer, Battleship Potemkin, Ivan the Terrible
 November 24 – Ruth Chatterton, 68, American actress, Dodsworth, Female
 December 20 – Moss Hart. 57, American playwright, Gentleman's Agreement, A Star Is Born
 December 27 – Bernard McConville, 74, American screenwriter, A Connecticut Yankee in King Arthur's Court, The Phantom of the Opera

Film debuts
Ann-Margret – Pocketful of Miracles
Ed Asner – The Murder Men
Warren Beatty – Splendor in the Grass
John Davis Chandler – Mad Dog Coll
Louis Gossett Jr. – A Raisin in the Sun
Gene Hackman – Mad Dog Coll
Lance Henriksen – The Outsider
George Kennedy – The Little Shepherd of Kingdom Come
Harvey Korman – Living Venus
Dudley Moore – The Third Alibi
Joe Pesci – Hey, Let's Twist!
Burt Reynolds – Angel Baby
Telly Savalas – Mad Dog Coll
George Segal – The Young Doctors

Notes

References 

 
Film by year